Mount Elliot is a mountain  high rising between Kirkby Glacier and O'Hara Glacier, about  south of Yule Bay, in the Anare Mountains of Victoria Land. A mountain in this approximate position was sighted by Captain James C. Ross of the Royal Navy in February 1841, who named it for Rear Admiral George Elliot, Commander-in-Chief in the Cape of Good Hope Station.

References 

Mountains of Victoria Land